TiSPACE, officially Taiwan Innovative Space Inc., is a space launch company from Taiwan. Its sister company, ATSpace, is headquartered in South Australia.

History
TiSPACE was founded in 2016 by a group of investors, scientists, and engineers led by Yen-Sen Chen who had previously worked at the NSPO and at NASA’s Marshall Space Flight Center. In 2019 they signed an MOU with National Central University to promote domestic space launch and the space technology sector. They also attended the International Astronautical Congress, a first for a Taiwanese company.

TiSPACE scrapped their launch facility in Taiwan due to legal issues. In August 2021 TiSPACE announced plans to launch from the Whalers Way Orbital Launch Complex in Australia rather than Taiwan. They received the first flight approval permit ever issued by the Australian government.

ATSpace, TiSPACE's sister company, was founded in January 2021 to develop the company's rocket technologies in Australia. As of August 2022, ATSpace plans to conduct future suborbital test launches at Whalers Way in place of TiSPACE.

Facilities
Structural dynamics tests are performed at the National Center for Research on Earthquake Engineering.

Hot fire test facility
TiSPACE conducts engine tests at its vertical hot fire test facility.

Nantian launch facility
TiSPACE’s launch facility is located in the Nantian are of Taitung county. According to TiSPACE the facility features "launch pad, launch support rail, an oxidizer filling facility, vehicle/payload assembly building, launch command center, and tracking/communication antenna."

Launch vehicles

HAPITH I (Kestrel I)
HAPITH I (known as Kestrel I when operated by ATSpace) is a two stage sub-orbital rocket designed to validate TiSPACE’s hybrid-propellant rocket system. The HAPITH I has 100% domestically sourced components. Hapith is Saisiyat for flying squirrel.

The first launch of the HAPITH I was scheduled for December 27, 2019 but was called off after protest from the local indigenous community. With the blessings of the community the launch was rescheduled for February 13 and was to include a Paiwan blessing of the rocket. The February 13 launch was scrubbed due to weather. As of August 2021, the first launch of HAPITH I was scheduled to take place at Whalers Way Orbital Launch Complex, South Australia, in late 2021.

On 16 September 2021, 06:39 UTC the Hapith I rocket (flight VS01) launched from Whalers Way Pad 1 on a suborbital test flight. This was the maiden flight of Hapith I and first of three test launches from Pad 1 at Whalers Way. The flight suffered a launch failure at ignition and did not reach space. As payload the rocket carried an Ionosphere Scintillation Package (ISP) for NSPO for the purpose of Ionospheric scintillation research.

Two more test launches of the vehicle, conducted by ATSpace under the Kestrel I name, are scheduled for late 2022.

HAPITH I has two stages; the first stage has 4 motors, and the second stage has a single motor. All motors are similar, having a composite outer shell with styrene-butadiene rubber as fuel and nitrous oxide as oxidizer.

HAPITH V
The HAPITH V is a three stage orbital rocket in development from the HAPITH I with an approximate height of 20 m, a diameter of 2.2 m, and a first stage thrust of 650 kN. The target payload is 390 kg to LEO and 350 kg to SSO. It will be TiSPACE’s first commercial offering.

HAPITH V has three stages; the first stage has 5 motors, the second stage has 4 motors, and the third stage has a single motor. All motors are similar, having a composite outer shell with styrene-butadiene rubber as fuel and nitrous oxide as oxidizer.

See also
List of companies of Taiwan
NewSpace
Rocket Lab
Advanced Rocket Research Center
National Chung-Shan Institute of Science and Technology

References

Taiwanese companies established in 2016
Space program of Taiwan
Private spaceflight companies
Aerospace companies of Taiwan